Pernastela is a genus of three pinhead or dot snail species that are endemic to Australia's Lord Howe Island in the Tasman Sea.

Species
 Pernastela charon Iredale, 1944 – lowland forest pinhead snail
 Pernastela gnoma Iredale, 1944 – dwarf pinhead snail
 Pernastela howensis Iredale, 1944 – Lord Howe pinhead snail

References

 
 

 
 
Gastropod genera
Taxa named by Tom Iredale
Gastropods described in 1944
Gastropods of Lord Howe Island